Events from the year 1623 in Ireland.

Incumbent
Monarch: James I

Events
January 21 – Viscount Falkland, England's Lord Deputy of Ireland, issues a proclamation ordering all Roman Catholic priests to leave Ireland.
June 20 – order issued requiring civic officials to take the Oath of Supremacy and enforcing excommunication against those who have relapsed.
June 29 – Malcolm Hamilton is consecrated Church of Ireland Archbishop of Cashel.

Honours
February 4 – the Talbot Baronetcy, of Carton in the County of Kildare, is created in the Baronetage of Ireland for the lawyer and politician William Talbot.
February 21 – the Barnewall Baronetcy, of Crickstown Castle in the County of Meath, is created in the Baronetage of Ireland for Patrick Barnewall.
May 2 – the Stewart Baronetcy, of Ramelton in the County of Donegal, is created in the Baronetage of Ireland for the soldier William Stewart.
December 30 – the Newcomen Baronetcy, of Kenagh in the County of Longford, is created in the Baronetage of Ireland for Robert Newcomen.
The Dungan Baronetcy, of Castletown in the County of Kildare, is created in the Baronetage of Ireland for Walter Dungan.
The title of Viscount Magennis of Iveagh is created for the chief of the clan Magennis.

Births
Sir George Downing, 1st Baronet, soldier, statesman and diplomat (d. 1684)
Approximate date
James Lynch (archbishop of Tuam) (d. 1713)
Hugh Montgomery, 1st Earl of Mount Alexander, soldier (d. 1663)

Deaths
Henry Piers, landowner and politician (b. 1568)

References

 
1620s in Ireland
Ireland
Years of the 17th century in Ireland